József Fabinyi (31 March 1887 – 9 April 1949) was a Hungarian swimmer. He competed in the men's 200 metre breaststroke event at the 1908 Summer Olympics.

References

1887 births
1949 deaths
Hungarian male swimmers
Olympic swimmers of Hungary
Swimmers at the 1908 Summer Olympics
Sportspeople from Cluj-Napoca